George Dent (1756 – December 2, 1813) was an American planter and politician from Maryland who served in the House of Representatives from 1793 to 1801.

Early life

Dent was born on his father's estate, "Windsor Castle", on the Mattawoman Creek in Charles County. His father, General John Dent (1733-1809), was a planter who was a patriot during the Revolutionary War.

Revolutionary War

He initially served during the Revolutionary War in 1776 as a 1st lieutenant in the Third Battalion of the Flying Camp from Maryland.  After the Flying Camp was disbanded in December 1776, Dent returned to Maryland and was commissioned a 1st lieutenant in the Charles County militia under Captain Thomas H. Marshall.  He was subsequently promoted to captain and assigned to the Twenty-sixth Battalion in May 1778.

Political career

After the war, Dent served as a member of the Maryland House of Delegates from 1782 to 1790, where he was speaker pro tempore in 1788 and speaker in 1789 and 1790.  He served as the justice of the Charles County Court in 1791 and 1792, and as member of the Maryland Senate in 1791 and 1792, where he was President of the Senate during the latter year until his resignation on December 21, 1792.

In 1792, Dent was elected as a Pro-Administration candidate to the Third Congress and reelected as a Federalist to the Fourth through Sixth Congresses, serving from March 4, 1793, to March 3, 1801.  In Congress, Dent served as chairman of the Committee on Elections (Sixth Congress).  He also served as Speaker pro tempore of the House at various times from 1797 to 1799.

Upon leaving Congress, Dent was appointed by President Thomas Jefferson as United States marshal of the District Court for the Potomac District at Washington, D.C., on April 4, 1801.

Family and later life

His father had been a general during the Revolutionary War. His grandfather, George Dent, had been Chief Justice of Maryland. Judge Thomas Dent, Sr. was his grandfather's grandfather. The Dent family had been part of Maryland society from the very beginning of the colony. His son was naval hero of the Barbary Wars, Captain John H. Dent. George Dent left his family and public service behind when he moved to Georgia in 1802 and settled about twelve miles from Augusta. He died in 1813 in a horseback riding accident and is interred on his plantation.

References

Presidents of the Maryland State Senate
Speakers of the Maryland House of Delegates
Maryland militiamen in the American Revolution
People from Charles County, Maryland
United States Marshals
1756 births
1813 deaths
American planters
American militia officers
Federalist Party members of the United States House of Representatives from Maryland